This is a list of places named for the Marquis de Lafayette, a French General in the American Revolutionary War. Many of these places were named for him during his 1824–1825 visit to the United States.

Counties 

 Fayette County, Alabama
 Fayette County, Georgia
 Fayette County, Illinois
 Fayette County, Indiana
 Fayette County, Iowa
 Fayette County, Kentucky
 Fayette County, Ohio
 Fayette County, Pennsylvania
 Fayette County, Tennessee
 Fayette County, Texas
 Fayette County, West Virginia
 Lafayette County, Arkansas
Lafayette County, Florida
 Lafayette County, Mississippi
Lafayette County, Missouri
Lafayette County, Wisconsin
Lafayette Parish, Louisiana

Cities, towns, and villages 

 Fayette, Alabama
 Fayette, Iowa
 Fayette, Maine
 Fayette, Michigan
 Fayette, Mississippi
 Fayette, Missouri
 Fayette, New York
 Fayette, Ohio
 Fayette, Utah
 Fayette, West Virginia
 Fayette, Wisconsin, a town
 Fayette (community), Wisconsin, an unincorporated community

Fayette City, Pennsylvania
Fayette Township, Calhoun County, Arkansas
 Fayette Township, Livingston County, Illinois
 Fayette Township, Vigo County, Indiana
 Fayette Township, Decatur County, Iowa
 Fayette Township, Linn County, Iowa
 Fayette Township, Michigan
 Fayette Township, Lawrence County, Ohio
 Fayette Township, Juniata County, Pennsylvania
 Fayetteville, Alabama
 Fayetteville, Arkansas is named indirectly; the city is named after Fayetteville, TN, which in turn is named after Fayetteville, NC. Has the largest metropolitan population.
Fayetteville, Georgia, seat of Fayette County
Fayetteville, Illinois
Fayetteville, Indiana
Fayetteville, Washington County, Indiana
Fayetteville, Missouri
Fayetteville, New York
Fayetteville, North Carolina was the first city named after Lafayette, and is the only one he actually visited, arriving in Fayetteville by horse-drawn carriage in 1825 during Lafayette's visit to the United States from July 1824 to September 1825 celebrating the 50th anniversary of the Battle of Bunker Hill. Has the greatest city population.
Fayetteville, Ohio
Fayetteville, Pennsylvania
Fayetteville, Tennessee is named indirectly; the city is named after Fayetteville, North Carolina.
Fayetteville, Texas
Fayetteville, West Virginia
La Fayette, Illinois
LaFayette, Alabama
LaFayette, Georgia
Lafayette, California
Lafayette, Indiana, seat of Tippecanoe County, named after Lafayette during his tour of America.
LaFayette, Kentucky
Lafayette, Louisiana
Lafayette, Minnesota
LaFayette, New York
Lafayette, Oregon
Lafayette, Tennessee
Lafayette metropolitan area, Louisiana
Lafayette metropolitan area, Indiana
Lafayette Township, Lonoke County, Arkansas
 Lafayette Township, Ouachita County, Arkansas
 Lafayette Township, Scott County, Arkansas

 Lafayette Township, Coles County, Illinois
 LaFayette Township, Ogle County, Illinois
 Lafayette Township, Allen County, Indiana
 Lafayette Township, Floyd County, Indiana
 Lafayette Township, Madison County, Indiana
 Lafayette Township, Owen County, Indiana
 Lafayette Township, Allamakee County, Iowa
 Lafayette Township, Bremer County, Iowa
 Lafayette Township, Keokuk County, Iowa
 Lafayette Township, Story County, Iowa
 Lafayette Township, Chautauqua County, Kansas
 Lafayette Township, Michigan
 Lafayette Township, Minnesota

 Lafayette Township, Clinton County, Missouri
 Lafayette Township, St. Louis County, Missouri

 Lafayette Township, New Jersey

 Lafayette Township, Coshocton County, Ohio
 Lafayette Township, Medina County, Ohio

 Lafayette Township, Pennsylvania
North Fayette Township, Allegheny County, Pennsylvania
South Fayette Township, Allegheny County, Pennsylvania
West Lafayette, Indiana, the home of Purdue University and sister city of Lafayette, Indiana
West Lafayette, Ohio

Squares 

 Lafayette Square in Buffalo, New York, where he spoke during his nationwide tour in 1825.
Lafayette Square station, a Buffalo Metro Rail station
Lafayette Square in Saint Louis, Missouri, neighborhood created in 1833 as one of the city's first public parks and named in his honor in 1854.

 Lafayette Square, Los Angeles, Mid-Wilshire neighborhood of Los Angeles, California
 Lafayette Square, one of 22 historic public squares in Savannah, Georgia
 Lafayette Square (New Orleans), in the Central Business District, New Orleans, Louisiana
 Lafayette Square (Baltimore), Maryland
 Lafayette Square, Cambridge, part of the Central Square area of Cambridge, Massachusetts
 Lafayette Square Historic District (St. Louis)
 Lafayette Square, Washington, D.C., northernmost part of President's Park
 Lafayette Square Historic District, Washington, D.C.

Streets 

 Rue La Fayette in Paris, one of the longest roads in the city, which crosses the 9th and 10th arrondissements of the city from southwest to northeast.
 Lafayette Street in New Haven, Connecticut
 Lafayette Street in Williston Park, New York
 New York City
 Lafayette Avenue in Brooklyn
 Lafayette Avenue in The Bronx
 Lafayette Street in Manhattan
 Lafayette Street in Queens
 Lafayette Street in Staten Island
 Lafayette Street in Schenectady, New York
 Fayette Drive in Rotterdam, New York
 Lafayette Road in New Hampshire, which extends from the Massachusetts border in Seabrook to Portsmouth
 Avenue de Lafayette in Boston, Massachusetts, located in the Downtown Crossing area.
 Lafayette Avenue in Baltimore, Maryland
 Lafayette Avenue in Cliffside Park, New Jersey
 Lafayette Avenue in Hawthorne, New Jersey 
 Lafayette Avenue in Omaha, Nebraska
 Lafayette Boulevard in Detroit, Michigan
 Lafayette Boulevard in Bridgeport, Connecticut
 Lafayette Road in Harrington Park, New Jersey
 Lafayette Street in Houma, Louisiana
 Lafayette Street in Cape May, New Jersey
 Lafayette Street in Waltham, Massachusetts, located near a critical area during the Revolution.
 Ulice Lafayettova in Olomouc, Czech Republic, is near the site of Lafayette's imprisonment.
 Lafayette Street in Metamora, Illinois
 Lafayette Drive and Lafayette Road in Phoenixville, Pennsylvania, both off of Valley Forge Road located near Valley Forge.
 Fayette Street in Conshohocken, Pennsylvania.
 Fayette Street in Alexandria, Virginia.
 Route Lafayette in Shanghai, China (Shanghai French Concession) (1914-1943), now renamed Fu Xing Zhong Road.
Lafayette Road and Fayette Lane in Knoxville, Tennessee.
Lafayette Drive in Oak Ridge, Tennessee.
Lafayette Avenue in Morrisville, Pennsylvania.

Other places 

 23244 Lafayette, a main-belt minor planet
 Aix-la-Fayette, a commune in the Puy-de-Dôme department in Auvergne in central France
 Chavaniac-Lafayette is a commune in the Haute-Loire department in south-central France
Fayette Historic State Park, Michigan
Fayetteville Shale
Fort Lafayette, New York
 Galeries Lafayette, a French department store chain (first store was Rue Lafayette in Paris)
Lafayette, a French restaurant in New York City which operated from 1965 to the late 1970s
Lafayette Apartment Building (Washington, D.C.)
Lafayette Building (Washington, D.C.)
Lafayette Building (Detroit)
Lafayette Circus (Theatre), Manhattan, New York City, New York, United States.
Lafayette College, in Easton, Pennsylvania
 Lafayette High School (Alabama), in Lafayette, Alabama
 Lafayette High School (Georgia), in Lafayette, Georgia
Lafayette High School (Florida), in Mayo, Florida
 Lafayette High School, in Lexington, Kentucky
 Lafayette High School, in Lafayette, Louisiana
 Lafayette High School, in St. Joseph, Missouri
 Lafayette High School, in Wildwood, Missouri
 Lafayette High School, in Brooklyn, New York
 Lafayette High School, in Buffalo, New York
 Lafayette High School, near Williamsburg, Virginia
 Lafayette Hill, Pennsylvania
 Lafayette River
 Lafayette Theatre (Suffern), in Suffern, Rockland County, New York, United States
 Lafayette Theatre (Harlem), in Harlem, Manhattan, New York City, New York, United States

 Hotel Lafayette, an historic hotel in Buffalo, New York
 Hotel Lafayette, a hotel and restaurant which operated in New York City
 LaFayette Hotel, an historic hotel in Little Rock, Arkansas
 The Lafayette Hotel, Swim Club & Bungalows, a hotel in San Diego, California
 LaFayette Jr./Sr. High School in LaFayette, New York
 Lafayette Square Mall, Indianapolis, Indiana
Mount Lafayette in the White Mountains of New Hampshire
University of Louisiana at Lafayette
Lafayetteville, a hamlet in Milan, New York

See also 

 Lafayette (disambiguation)
 Lafayette County (disambiguation)
 Lafayette Township (disambiguation)
 Lafayette Hill (disambiguation)
 Lafayette Park (disambiguation)
 Lafayette Square (disambiguation)
 Fayette (disambiguation)
 Fayette County (disambiguation)
 Fayette Township (disambiguation)
 Fayetteville (disambiguation)

References 

Fayette, Marquis de la place names
Fayette
Gilbert du Motier, Marquis de Lafayette